Walter Gerhard Martin Sommer (8 February 1915 – 7 June 1988) was an SS Hauptscharführer (master sergeant) who served as a guard at the concentration camps of Dachau and Buchenwald. Sommer, known as the "Hangman of Buchenwald" was considered a depraved sadist who reportedly ordered two Austrian priests, Otto Neururer and Mathias Spannlang, to be crucified upside-down.

Buchenwald
In 1943 Reichsführer Heinrich Himmler appointed SS judge Georg Konrad Morgen to investigate charges of cruelty and corruption at the Buchenwald camp. Due to his excessive brutality and sadism, Sommer was indicted and tried before Morgen. Commandant Karl Koch and his wife Ilse Koch were also put on trial.

According to Morgen, Sommer had a secret compartment underneath the floor under his desk. He kept his private instruments of torture concealed within this compartment such as the needles he used to kill his victims after he had finished torturing them, he would inject them with carbolic acid, or inject air into their veins causing their death by embolism. On occasions, after private late night torture sessions Sommer would hide his victim's bodies under his bed until he could dispose of them in the morning.

Among his acts of depravity were beating a German pastor, hanging him naked outside in the winter then throwing buckets of water on him and letting him freeze to death. On another occasion, Sommer beat a Catholic priest to death for performing the Sacrament of Penance for a fellow inmate.

In the spring of 1943, Sommer was transferred to a regular combat division. He served in the 9th SS Panzer Division Hohenstaufen until August 1943, when he was recalled. Sommer was then arrested and charged with embezzlement and committing unauthorized murders in the camp. Sommer initially denied his guilt, but admitted to secretly killing 40 to 50 prisoners. According to Sommer's own testimony in 1967, he was only charged with two counts of murder and one count of attempted murder. The court had refused to allow him to testify about unauthorized murders he committed on Koch's personal orders.

It is not known whether Sommer was actually convicted of any charges. However, after the trial, he was sentenced to probation on the front lines. On 8 April 1945, Sommer was critically injured after an American bomber plane with a full payload crashed next to his tank. Sommer suffered injuries to his left arm, right leg, and stomach. The injuries to his left arm and right leg were severe enough that both had to be amputated.

After recovering from his injuries, Sommer was interned by American occupation authorities due to his SS membership. However, he managed to conceal his identity and thus avoid what would've been a near certain death sentence in the Buchenwald trial. Sommer was released from internment in June 1947 and sent to a home for the disabled. A former prisoner recognized him later that year, which led to his arrest in February 1950. However, the charges were initially dropped due to his wartime injuries.

Retrial and imprisonment
After his release he returned to West Germany where he married, fathered a child and filed for and received a pension for his service related disabilities. In 1957, he was indicted for complicity in the death of 101 concentration camp inmates. In July 1958 in Bayreuth district court in West Germany, he was ultimately convicted of 25 deaths and received a life sentence. Upon appeal, the case was upheld in May 1959 by the Federal Court. In 1971, Sommer was released from prison since there was no facility to continue his treatment of his wartime injuries. He was transferred to a hospital and in 1973 to a nursing home where he remained until his death in 1988.

References

Sources
The Buchenwald Report by David A. Hackett Publisher: Basic Books (September 11, 1997) Language: English

External links
 Blessed Otto Neururer

1915 births
1988 deaths
SS non-commissioned officers
Waffen-SS personnel
Buchenwald concentration camp personnel
Dachau concentration camp personnel
Nazi persecution of the Catholic Church
Anti-Christian sentiment in Europe
German people convicted of murder
German prisoners sentenced to life imprisonment
German prisoners of war in World War II held by the United States
Nazis convicted of war crimes
Prisoners sentenced to life imprisonment by Germany
Criminals from Thuringia
German amputees